Angustifodilactones are natural compounds isolated from Kadsura and showing some activity against HIV in the cell culture.

See also
 Angustific acid
 Neokadsuranin

References

Lactones
Cyclopropanes
Oxygen heterocycles
Heterocyclic compounds with 5 rings